Lester Nicholas Ruwe (1933–1990) was the United States Ambassador to Iceland from 1985 until 1989.

Ruwe helped settle disputes involving shipping and whaling and was responsible for the operation of the 1986 summit meeting between President Ronald Reagan and Mikhail Gorbachev. He was chief of staff in New York for former President Richard M. Nixon (1980-1984), assistant chief of protocol at the State Department from 1969 to 1975, and was responsible for the state funerals of former Presidents Harry S. Truman and Dwight D. Eisenhower and for the world tour of Apollo 11 astronauts Neil Armstrong, Buzz Aldrin, and Michael Collins after their return from the Moon in 1969.

Ruwe graduated from Brown University in 1955 and the University of Michigan Graduate School of Business Administration in 1956.

He died of cancer at the Mayo Clinic.

References

1933 births
1990 deaths
20th-century American businesspeople
Ambassadors of the United States to Iceland
Brown University alumni
Businesspeople from Detroit
Deaths from cancer in Minnesota
Ross School of Business alumni